Michael Harvey Tonkin (born November 19, 1989) is an American professional baseball pitcher for the Atlanta Braves of Major League Baseball (MLB). He previously has played for the Minnesota Twins of Major League Baseball (MLB) and the Hokkaido Nippon-Ham Fighters of Nippon Professional Baseball (NPB).

Career

Minnesota Twins
Tonkin attended Palmdale High School in Palmdale, California. The Minnesota Twins selected Tonkin in the 30th round, 906th overall, of the 2008 Major League Baseball Draft. He made his professional debut with the rookie-level GCL Twins, and recorded a 3.27 ERA in 6 games. He returned to the team the following year, posting a 3-4 record and 3.62 ERA in 11 appearances. In 2010, Tonkin split the year between the rookie-level Elizabethton Twins and the Single-A Beloit Snappers, pitching to a 4-6 record and 3.40 ERA in 23 appearances between the two teams. He returned to Beloit in 2011, and pitched to a 4-3 record and 3.87 ERA with 69 strikeouts in 76.2 innings of work. In 2012, Tonkin split the season between Beloit and the High-A Fort Myers Miracle, logging a cumulative 4-1 record and 2.08 ERA in 44 appearances. On November 20, 2012, the Twins added Tonkin to their 40-man roster. He was assigned to the Double-A New Britain Rock Cats to begin the 2013 season, and received a promotion to the Triple-A Rochester Red Wings later in the year.

On July 11, 2013, the Twins promoted Tonkin to the major leagues for the first time, and he made his major league debut that day, pitching an inning and a third of scoreless ball against the Tampa Bay Rays. He finished his rookie season with a 0.79 ERA in 9 appearances with Minnesota. Tonkin was optioned to the Triple-A Rochester Red Wings on March 24, 2014, but recalled by the Twins on March 31 before the Rochester season began. He was optioned back to Rochester on April 3, and recalled on April 12. He was returned to Rochester again on May 9. Tonkin finished the 2014 season with a 4.74 ERA in 24 big league games with the Twins. In 2015 with Minnesota, Tonkin pitched to a 3.47 ERA with 19 strikeouts in 23.1 innings pitched. In 2016, for the Twins, he was 3-2 with a 5.02 ERA in 65 appearances out of the bullpen. On May 6, 2017, Tonkin was designated for assignment. He was outrighted to Rochester on May 13. On September 5, Tonkin was selected back to the 40-man roster. He ended the year having pitched in 16 games for the Twins, posting a 5.14 ERA with 24 strikeouts in 21.0 innings.

Hokkaido Nippon-Ham Fighters
On November 9, 2017, Tonkin's contract was sold to the Hokkaido Nippon-Ham Fighters of Nippon Professional Baseball (NPB). In 2018, Tonkin pitched in 53 games for the Fighters, recording a 4-4 record and 3.71 ERA with 33 strikeouts in 51.0 innings of work. He became a free agent after the season.

Texas Rangers
On January 8, 2019, Tonkin signed a minor league deal with the Texas Rangers organization. He was released by Texas on March 21, 2019.

Milwaukee Brewers
On March 22, 2019, Tonkin signed a minor league contract with the Milwaukee Brewers organization. Tonkin registered a 3-0 record and 4.26 ERA in 14 games with the Triple-A San Antonio Missions before he was released by the team on June 10.

Long Island Ducks
On June 18, 2019, Tonkin signed with the Long Island Ducks of the independent Atlantic League of Professional Baseball. In 21 games with Long Island, Tonkin pitched to a 3-2 record and 0.34 ERA with 31 strikeouts in 26.2 innings pitched.

Arizona Diamondbacks
On August 18, 2019, Tonkin's contract was purchased by the Arizona Diamondbacks organization and he was assigned to the Triple-A Reno Aces. Tonkin finished the year with Reno, logging a 7.71 ERA in 5 games. Tonkin did not play in a game in 2020 due to the cancellation of the minor league season because of the COVID-19 pandemic. On May 22, 2020, Tonkin was released by Arizona.

Long Island Ducks (second stint)
On March 31, 2021, Tonkin signed with the Long Island Ducks of the Atlantic League of Professional Baseball. Operating as a closer, Tonkin earned 9 saves and posted a league-leading 0.53 ERA over 17 innings pitched.

Toros de Tijuana
On July 13, 2021, Tonkin's contract was purchased by the Toros de Tijuana of the Mexican League.

Atlanta Braves
On January 11, 2022, Tonkin signed a minor league contract with the Atlanta Braves. He had his contract selected following the 2022 season.

Personal
Tonkin's brother-in-law is Jason Kubel.

References

External links

1989 births
Living people
Águilas Cibaeñas players
American expatriate baseball players in the Dominican Republic
American expatriate baseball players in Japan
Baseball players from California
Beloit Snappers players
Elizabethton Twins players
Fort Myers Miracle players
Gulf Coast Twins players
Hokkaido Nippon-Ham Fighters players
Long Island Ducks players
Major League Baseball pitchers
Minnesota Twins players
New Britain Rock Cats players
Nippon Professional Baseball pitchers
People from Glendale, California
Peoria Javelinas players
Reno Aces players
Rochester Red Wings players
San Antonio Missions players
Sportspeople from Glendale, California
People from Palmdale, California